Geneva High School is a public secondary school located in Geneva, Alabama.
The school serves about 390 students in grades 9-12 and is a part of the Geneva City School District.

Geneva Middle School is located inside the Geneva High School campus.

Academics 

In 2000, Geneva High School student David N. Simmons was selected as a Presidential Scholar.

In 2011, Megan Saunders was named the first female state FFA officer for the state of Alabama from Geneva. The last state officer was Larry Justice in 1961. Women were not admitted until 1969.

Athletics 
Geneva High School is a member of the Alabama High School Athletic Association competing in Division 3A as of 2007. The school's athletic teams are named the Panthers and the school colors are black and gold.

The girls softball team won the Division 4A state slow pitch championship in 1999 and 2000 and Division 4A-5A-6A championship in 2001.

In 1975, Eddie Brooks won the Division 3A state championship for the 3-mile cross country.
In 2000, Tommy Casey won the Division 4A golf state championship.

Geneva won the Division 3A-4A state championships in boys track and field in 1987 and 1988 and won the Division 4A state championship in 1989.

The members of the 2007-2008 girls basketball team were the State Runners-Up under Head Coach Rich Bixby.

Notable alumni 
 Albert A. Carmichael, Lieutenant Governor of Alabama (1939–1943)
 Early Wynn, Former MLB player (Washington Senators, Cleveland Indians, Chicago White Sox)

References 

Schools in Geneva County, Alabama
Public high schools in Alabama